Julia Pylad is a Swedish Model and Pageant Titleholder. She won the title of Miss Global Sweden 2019 and is a finalist in Top Model Worldwide 2020 Season 13.

Multiple Swedish newspapers have written articles about her and her journey to become a model and the Miss Global Sweden 2019. She was first recognized in Norrköpings Tidningar and later on in the Swedish newspapers Expressen and Länstidningen as well.

References 

1999 births
Living people
Swedish female models
Swedish beauty pageant winners